The band-tailed antbird (Hypocnemoides maculicauda) is a species of bird in the family Thamnophilidae. It is found in the Amazon Basin south of the river Amazon (Bolivia, Brazil and Peru). Its natural habitat is subtropical or tropical swamps and flooded forests.

The band-tailed antbird was described by the Austrian ornithologist August von Pelzeln in 1868 and given the binomial name Hypocnemis maculicauda.

References

band-tailed antbird
Birds of the Amazon Basin
band-tailed antbird
Taxonomy articles created by Polbot